Chastity Brown (born June 1, 1982) is an American singer-songwriter and musician based out of Minneapolis, Minnesota.  Critics have dubbed her "a banjo-playing soul-singer" and "a rocking, rolling encyclopedia of roots music."

Biography and music career
Raised in Union City, Tennessee, Chastity grew up playing the saxophone and drums in church before she started to write and sing her own songs.  She performed her first show in Knoxville, Tennessee before moving to Minneapolis in 2006. Brown self-released her debut album Do the Best You Can in 2007 and follow-up, Sankofa in 2009. Both were met with critical acclaim.  Music critic Jim Walsh of the Star Tribune commented, "...for those who appreciate songwriter-fueled jazz and a sense of organic greatness in the making, she is nothing short of a massage therapist for the ears and soul."

She released her 2010 album High Noon Teeth with bandmates, Michael X. (percussion), Adam Wozniak (of Dark Dark Dark, upright bass) and Nikki Schultz (backing vocals). Brown's song "By the Train Tracks" was 89.3 The Current's "Song of the Day" on June 6, 2010.

In October 2011, Chastity Brown was discovered by Fred Cannon SVP of BMI at the Bitter End.  He introduced her to Rose Drake, who signed her to Creative and Dreams Music Network.  Cannon brought in Paul Buono to produce with him "a classic record, that will be memorable and will put Chasity Brown on the map."   In 2012, she released Back-Road Highways on Creative and Dreams Music Network, based out of Nashville, Tennessee.  Musicians include Chastity's long-time guitar player, Robert Mulrennan, along with Blair Masters on B-3 organ, Anton Nesbitt on bass, and Bernard Bell on drums.  She was chosen as Minneapolis' Best Folk Artist in early 2012 before garnering nods from NPR as a "promising new voice," and best album nods from 89.3 The Current, Star Tribune, City Pages, and Lavender Magazine.  She toured Europe for the first time that same year and sold out her first two shows in Kiel, Germany.  While touring with Back-Road Highways, she supported Michael Kiwanuka, Dar Williams, Raul Midon, and Leon Russell.

Chastity's hit single, "After You" landed on 89.3 The Current's Top 89 Songs of 2012, and was also featured in the BBC & HBO television movie, Mary & Martha, starring Hilary Swank.  After seeing Chastity's performance of "After You" at the Americana Music Festival in Nashville, CMT highlighted it as a Top Ten Moment of the 2012 festival, stating "she's definitely a songwriter and performer to watch."

On July 28, 2016, Chastity signed with Red House Records.

Non-profit contributions
Brown is involved in a number of nonprofit and charitable events around the Twin Cities.  She was a contributing artist to the 2012 album Think Out Loud: Music Serving the Homeless in the Twin Cities, and has performed at events for nonprofits promoting youth access to the arts, including Vega Productions, Inc., and Free Arts Minnesota, among others.

Discography

Studio albums
 Do the Best You Can (2007)
 Sankofa (2009)
 High Noon Teeth (2010)
 Back-Road Highways (2012)
 Long Way (2014)
 Silhouette of Sirens (2017)
 Sing to the Walls (2022)

References

External links
 Chastity Brown’s Official Website
 Featured in a Daytrotter Session on April 19, 2013
 Featured in a NorthShore Sessions video
 Featured on the PBS program MN Original from the TPT St. Paul, Minnesota Station

1982 births
Living people
Musicians from Minneapolis
American pop musicians
American women singer-songwriters
Singer-songwriters from Minnesota
People from Union City, Tennessee
21st-century American singers
Artists from Minnesota
21st-century American women